Troitsky is a rural locality (a settlement) in Ikryaninsky District, Astrakhan Oblast, Russia. The population was 365 as of 2010. There are 2 streets.

Geography 
It is located 11 km SSW from Ikryanoye.

References 

Rural localities in Ikryaninsky District